= BCS Countdown =

BCS Countdown was a television program broadcast by ESPN. The program focused on the weekly BCS standings in college football and included interviews with players and coaches.
